This is a list of club records for K-League side Suwon Samsung Bluewings. It details records at club and player level since the team's league debut in 1996.

Club records
Correct as of December 31, 2008.

K-League records
By Year

By Team (1996–2014)

Records of wins 

Record of goals 

Records of assists 

Record for consecutive wins : 8 – 1999.7.29 ~ 1999.8.29 / 2008.3.19 ~ 2008.4.26
Record for consecutive ties: 4 – 1997.3.22 ~ 1997.4.2 / 2004.8.1 ~ 2004.8.11 
Record for consecutive loses: 3 – 2001.3.31 ~ 2001.4.8 / 2006.04.23 ~ 2006.05.05 
Record for matches without loses: 18 – 2008.03.09 ~ 2008.06.28
Record for matches without wins: 13 – 2006.04.23 ~ 2006.07.15

Asia records

AFC Champions League records

Asian Cup Winners Cup records

Asian Super Cup records

A3 Champions Cup records

Pan Pacific Championship

Players recordsCorrect as of December 31, 2008. Figures include all competitive matches.''

Top league goalscorers by season

All time goalscorers

See also
 K-League - All time records 

Records
South Korean football club records and statistics